Suffren (Q284) is a French nuclear attack submarine. It is the lead ship of the Suffren class, stemming from the Barracuda programme. The vessel was laid down on 19 December 2007 and launched on 1 August 2019 at Cherbourg. It was commissioned on 6 November 2020; while full operational service had originally been anticipated in 2021, this was pushed back into 2022 after further testing/trials by the Marine nationale. Pursuant to testing the submarine was then declared fully operational on 3 June 2022.

Design 
Unlike previous French submarines, Suffren is not equipped with a periscope, but rather an optronic mast, which allows for much longer range and outside visible spectrum detection of targets.

A first for the French Navy is the ability to deploy a small underwater vehicle for special forces use (similar to the US Navy ASDS) thanks to a dry deck shelter. Previously special forces used torpedo tubes and handheld propulsion systems.

The ship also has the ability to use the MdCN ground attack cruise missile in its submarine borne version, launched via torpedo tube.

It is said to be ten times quieter than the previous generation  nuclear attack submarine.

Crew 
Suffren is optimized for a small complement thanks to extensive automation throughout the ship. While being twice the size, it has a smaller crew than the preceding Rubis class. This combined larger hull and smaller crew compared to the Rubis class makes this ship the first French submarine to be designed to allow women on board. It has very spacious separate living quarters for men and women.

Construction and career 
The submarine was unveiled to the public on 12 July 2019 in Cherbourg, with a three-year delay, in front of French President Emmanuel Macron and Defense Minister Florence Parly. The K15 nuclear reactor came online on 18 December 2019. Sea trials started in 2020. It was commissioned on 6 November 2020 and became fully operational on 3 June 2022.

References 

2019 ships